The Society of Clinical Child and Adolescent Psychology (SCCAP) is an academic and professional society in the United States that was established to encourage the development and advancement of clinical child and adolescent psychology through integration of its scientific and professional aspects. The division promotes scientific inquiry, training, professional practice, and public policy in clinical child and adolescent psychology as a means of improving the welfare and mental health of children, youth, and families.

In the service of these goals, SCCAP promotes the general objectives of the American Psychological Association, and is listed as Division 53.

History
The society first appeared in the American Psychological Association as a section under the division of clinical psychology (Division 12) in 1962. As research in child development and behavior analysis progressed, the need for specialized training for clinical psychology students became more urgent. Conferences were held in the mid-1980s onward to discuss the material needed to treat children. By the next decade, Division 12 considered the possibility of clinical child psychology becoming its own division; and after a vote of the section members, the APA Council created the Division of Clinical Child Psychology (Division 53) in 1999. John Weisz became the first Division President the following year and the division went through a name change the year after that and maintains that title to the present day.

Past Presidents 
2000 John Weisz

2001 Philip Kendall

2002 Stephen Hinshaw

2003 Thomas Ollendick

2004 Benjamin Lahey

2005 Stephen Shirk

2006 Wendy Silverman

2007 Elizabeth McCauley

2008 Cheryl King

2009 Mary Fristad

2010 Anthony Spirito

2011 Anne Marie Albano

2012 Mary Fristad

2013 Marc Atkins

2014 Joan Asarnow

2015 John Piacentini

2016 Eric Youngstrom

2017 Mitch Prinstein

2018 Steve Lee

2019 Eric Youngstrom

2020 Steve Hinshaw

2021 Michael Southam-Gerow

2022 Anna Lau

2023 Yo Jackson

See also

Journal of Clinical Child & Adolescent Psychology
 Divisions of the American Psychological Association
Association for Psychological Science

References

Child and adolescent psychiatry organizations
Psychology organizations based in the United States